Tonse Ramesh Upendra Pai (22 October 1924  26 January 2005) was an Indian banker and educationalist. A monument was erected in Manipal in 2018 in honour of him.

References

Mangaloreans
1924 births
2005 deaths
Indian bankers
20th-century Indian educational theorists
Businesspeople from Mangalore